The house at 115–117 Jewett Street, in the Newton Corner village of Newton, Massachusetts, is one of the city's finest examples of the academic style of Second Empire design.  The -story wood-frame house was built in the 1860s, and features a projecting entry portico, a distinctive feature of the academic variant, and decorated dormers with segmented-arch or round-arch tops.  In addition to other well-preserved period details, the property also includes a mansard-roofed carriage house with cupola.

The house was listed on the National Register of Historic Places in 1986.

See also
 National Register of Historic Places listings in Newton, Massachusetts

References

Houses on the National Register of Historic Places in Newton, Massachusetts
Second Empire architecture in Massachusetts
Houses completed in 1865